Goodenia glareicola  is a species of flowering plant in the family Goodeniaceae and is endemic to the south-west of Western Australia. It is an erect, perennial herb with linear to lance-shaped leaves, and racemes of blue flowers with purplish spots.

Description

Taxonomy and naming
Goodenia glareicola was first formally described in 1990 by Roger Charles Carolin in the journal Telopea from material collected in 1931 by William Blackall near Newdegate. The specific epithet (glareicola) means "gravel-inhabiting".

Distribution and habitat
This goodenia grows in gravelly and sandy soil from Mullewa to Lake Grace in the south-west of Western Australia.

Conservation status
Goodenia glareicola is classified as "not threatened" by the Government of Western Australia Department of Parks and Wildlife.

References

glareicola
Eudicots of Western Australia
Plants described in 1990
Taxa named by Roger Charles Carolin
Endemic flora of Western Australia